Helen Gray may refer to:

Helen Gray (swimmer) (born 1956), Australian Olympic swimmer
Helen Gray Cone, poet and academic
Nelly Gray, song